Bryna is an Irish feminine name used mostly in North America. An uncommon name meaning "Strong One", Bryna may be a variant form of Breena, a variant spelling of Brenna, or a variant of Brianna, the female form Brian.

Some believe that the name Bryna is a feminine form of the Celtic Bren, derived from the root bri "strength," force." Alternatively, it may be derived from the Gaelic bran "raven."

Bryna is also used as a Jewish name, as an anglicised form of Yiddish ברײַנע (Brayne).

References

Irish-language feminine given names